Lucille Barkley (born Lucille Oshinski, November 3, 1924 – March 19, 1979) was an American film actress.

Early years
The daughter of Florian and Verna Oshinski, Barkley was born in Pennsylvania but considered Rochester, New York, her hometown. She gained early acting experience with productions of the Rochester Community Players.

She left Rochester in 1948 to study at the American Academy of Dramatic Arts.

Career
Barkley worked as a model with the Harry Conover agency.

She began her film career with Paramount Pictures, and after a year she signed with Universal-International.

In the mid-1950s, she began acting on television, including one episode of the Abbott and Costello Show, entitled, "Efficiency Experts."

Selected filmography
 The Big Clock (1948)
 The Great Plane Robbery (1950)
 Peggy (1950)
 The Desert Hawk (1950)
 The Fat Man (1951)
 Arizona Manhunt (1951)
 Bedtime for Bonzo (1951)
 Flight to Mars (1951)
 Angel Face (1953 film) (1953)
 Prisoners of the Casbah (1953)
 The Other Woman (1954)

References

Bibliography
 Blottner, Gene. Columbia Noir: A Complete Filmography, 1940-1962. McFarland, 2015.

External links

1924 births
1979 deaths
American film actresses
20th-century American actresses
American television actresses